This is a list of diplomatic missions of Sri Lanka, excluding honorary consulates.

Africa

 Cairo (Embassy)

 Addis Ababa (Embassy)

 Nairobi (High Commission)

 Victoria (High Commission)

 Pretoria (High Commission)

Americas

 Brasilia (Embassy)

 Ottawa (High Commission)
 Toronto (Consulate-General)

 Havana (Embassy)

 Washington, D.C. (Embassy)
 Los Angeles (Consulate-General)

Asia

 Manama (Embassy)

 Dhaka (High Commission)

 Beijing (Embassy)
 Guangzhou (Consulate-General)
 Shanghai (Consulate-General)

 New Delhi (High Commission)
 Chennai (Deputy High Commission)
 Mumbai (Consulate-General)

 Jakarta (Embassy)

 Tehran (Embassy)

 Baghdad (Embassy)

 Tel Aviv (Embassy)

 Tokyo (Embassy)

 Amman (Embassy)

 Kuwait City (Embassy)

 Beirut (Embassy)

 Kuala Lumpur (High Commission)

 Malé (High Commission)

 Yangon (Embassy)

 Kathmandu (Embassy)

 Muscat (Embassy)

 Islamabad (High Commission)
 Karachi (Consulate-General)

 Ramallah (Representative Office)

 Manila (Embassy)

 Doha (Embassy)

 Riyadh (Embassy)
 Jeddah (Consulate-General)

 Singapore (High Commission)

 Seoul (Embassy)

 Bangkok (Embassy)

 Ankara (Embassy)

 Abu Dhabi (Embassy)
 Dubai (Consulate-General)

 Hanoi (Embassy)

Europe

 Vienna (Embassy)

 Brussels (Embassy)

 Paris (Embassy)

 Berlin (Embassy)

 Rome (Embassy)
 Milan (Consulate-General)

 The Hague (Embassy)

 Warsaw (Embassy)

 Moscow (Embassy)

 Stockholm (Embassy)

 Geneva (Consulate-General)

 London (High Commission)

Oceania

 Canberra (High Commission)
 Melbourne (Consulate-General)

Multilateral organizations
 
Geneva (Permanent Mission)
New York City (Permanent Mission)
Vienna (Permanent Mission)

Gallery

See also
 Foreign relations of Sri Lanka
 List of diplomatic missions in Sri Lanka
 List of heads of missions from Sri Lanka

References

External links
 Ministry of Foreign Affairs of Sri Lanka - Missions Abroad

Diplomatic missions
Sri Lanka